Amaravathi Grammar High School was founded by Mr. Koteshvara Reddy in 1982.

Branches
It has several branches in Hyderabad, Telangana State in India. Some are at:
 Namalagundu
 Sitafalmandi

See also
Education in India
List of schools in India

References

External links
 Report on Gemini News Channel
 Facebook Page

Schools in Hyderabad, India
Educational institutions established in 1982
1982 establishments in Andhra Pradesh